Frodsham railway station serves the town of Frodsham, Cheshire, England. The station is managed by Transport for Wales. It was opened along with the line in 1850 and the station building is recorded in the National Heritage List for England as a designated Grade II listed building.  This was restored in 2012 and is in private ownership.

The station is unstaffed, however the North Cheshire Rail Users Group have "adopted" the station and work on a voluntary basis to keep it looking clean and tidy.

Facilities
Although unstaffed (as noted), the station has a self-service ticket machine (card payments only) to allow intending passengers to buy before boarding or to collect pre-paid tickets.  Train running information is provided by CIS displays, timetable posters and a pay phone.  Waiting shelters are also provided on both sides.  Step-free access is available to both platforms, although the footbridge between them has stairs.

Services
The station is served by an hourly Transport for Wales service to Manchester Airport via Warrington Bank Quay, an hourly service to Liverpool Lime Street also operated by Transport for Wales, and another hourly service to Leeds operated by Northern Trains. In the other direction, services run to Chester, with trains from Manchester often continuing along the North Wales Coast Line as far as Llandudno, while trains from Liverpool and Leeds currently terminate at Chester save for a single service to Wrexham on weekday and Saturday evenings for the Liverpool service. On Sundays trains only run between Manchester and Chester and Liverpool and Chester.

Frodsham is also served by the infrequent (three trains per day, now northbound only) Northern Trains-operated service between Manchester Victoria and Ellesmere Port, with a one-a-day extension to Leeds. This does not run on Saturdays and Sundays.

Expansion of services
Northern's planned Leeds–Manchester Victoria–Chester service stops here since its launch in May 2019, though only at weekday peak times in the current (May 2019) timetable.

Halton curve
North of Frodsham station, a connecting line to Runcorn (the Halton Curve) diverges. This line was, until September 2018, served by just one "parliamentary" passenger train a week (which operated on summer Saturdays only) to fulfil legal and contractual obligations and keep the line "open" in accordance with Government legislation. The curve had lost its regular service in May 1975, but continued to be used by seasonal passenger trains between Liverpool Lime Street and Llandudno until 1994 (hence the summer-only service requirement). The train started from Chester and ran non-stop to Runcorn, passing through Frodsham without calling.

In May 2019 regular service was reintroduced between Liverpool Lime Street and Chester, via Runcorn, with one train per hour every day. Transport for Wales Rail also run two trains a day from Wrexham General to Liverpool Lime Street with one in the opposite direction. These services were originally planned to start in December 2018; however, this was delayed due to a shortage of available rolling stock.

See also

 Listed buildings in Frodsham

References

Further reading

External links

Grade II listed buildings in Cheshire
Grade II listed railway stations
Railway stations in Cheshire
Former Birkenhead Railway stations
Railway stations in Great Britain opened in 1850
Northern franchise railway stations
Railway stations served by Transport for Wales Rail
Frodsham
DfT Category F1 stations